Qalandar Tappeh is a village in Atrak Rural District, Maneh District, Maneh and Samalqan County, North Khorasan Province, Iran. At the 2006 census, its population was 231, in 56 families.

References 

Populated places in Maneh and Samalqan County